Saint-Thurien may refer to two communes in France, both of them named after Saint Turian (Breton Sant Turian) a 7th Century saint:

Saint-Thurien, Eure, in the Eure département 
Saint-Thurien, Finistère, in the Finistère département